Thinoomba is a rural locality in the Fraser Coast Region, Queensland, Australia.

Geography 
The Maryborough–Biggenden Road (State Route 86) runs along the northern boundary.

History 
Thinoomba Provisional School opened circa 1898 and closed in 1908.

References 

Fraser Coast Region
Localities in Queensland